Laurie Dinnebeil is an American scholar of childhood education. She is the Daso Herb Endowed Chair at the University of Toledo.  She was editor-in-chief of the Journal of Early Intervention for a period of five years, beginning in 2014.

References

Year of birth missing (living people)
Living people
University of Toledo faculty
People from Toledo, Ohio